Sally Anne Biddulph (née Mules; born 16 October 1975 in Hitchin, Hertfordshire) is an English journalist and presenter employed by ITN.

Career
After a short stint working in business after university, Sally started her new career in journalism in newspapers writing for The Times and The Sunday Telegraph before moving into broadcasting, working in radio in Bern, Switzerland.

Later, she joined Westcountry Live in Plymouth as a production journalist, before branching out as a reporter and newsreader at ITV News Central in Abingdon and then a Political Correspondent for Thames Valley Tonight in Westminster.

Sally joined ITN in 2009, to work for the national ITV News. Since joining the company, she has been News Correspondent, Political Correspondent and a relief presenter on ITV News at 5:30, ITV Lunchtime News and ITV News Saturday primetime bulletins. Since 2014, Sally is a newsreader for ITV News London during Good Morning Britain and reporter on ITV Lunchtime News. She also presents weekend daytime updates for ITV News and ITV News London on a rotating basis.

References

External links

1975 births
British television newsreaders and news presenters
English television journalists
English women journalists
English television presenters
ITN newsreaders and journalists
ITV regional newsreaders and journalists
People from Hitchin
Living people
British women television journalists